Michelle Ferriols (born March 8, 1973), also known as Mickey Ferriols, is an American-born Filipino actress.

She has a son with ex-partner Archie Alemania named Brent Marcus Alemania.

Career
Ferriols shot into stardom via a PLDT commercial. She has since starred in memorable teleseryes like Sana Maulit Muli, Hiram, Dyosa, Ina Kapatid Anak and Kadenang Ginto, among all. She also appeared in several movie blockbusters such as Honey, Nasa Langit Na Ba Ako? (1998), Jose Rizal (1998), Kung Ako Na Lang Sana (2003), Caregiver (2008), and Born to Love You (2012); all of which she worked with high-caliber actors with the likes of Cesar Montano and Sharon Cuneta.

For some time, Ferriols hosted award-winning shows such as Eat Bulaga and Unang Hirit.

Filmography

Television

Film

References

1973 births
Living people
Star Magic
ABS-CBN personalities
GMA Network personalities
GMA Integrated News and Public Affairs people
Filipino television actresses
Filipino television personalities
Filipino people of American descent